This is a list of notable restaurants in Switzerland.

Restaurants in Switzerland

 Piz Gloria
 Hiltl Restaurant
 Restaurant Talvo

Restaurants in Zürich

 Bauschänzli 
 Bernhard-Theater Zürich 
 Blindekuh 
 Grimmenturm 
 Hiltl Restaurant 
 Irchelpark 
 Ristorante Cooperativo
 Theater am Hechtplatz 
 Theater Rigiblick 
 Villa Belvoir 
 Zeughauskeller
 Zunfthaus zur Meisen 
 Zunfthaus zur Saffran 
 Zunfthaus zur Zimmerleuten

See also

 Swiss cuisine
 List of companies of Switzerland
 List of Michelin starred restaurants Switzerland
 Lists of restaurants

References

External links
 

Restaurants in Switzerland
Switzerland